NPV may refer to:

In economics:
 Net present value, an economic standard method for evaluating competing long-term projects in capital budgeting

In politics:
 National Popular Vote Interstate Compact, an initiative in the United States to elect the presidential candidate with the most votes nationwide

In medicine and science:

 Negative predictive value, in biostatistics, the proportion of patients with negative test results who are correctly diagnosed
 Nuclear Polyhedrosis Virus, a virus that infects butterflies and moths
 Negative Phase Velocity, an electromagnetic property induced by some exotic optical materials
 Negative pressure ventilator,  a type of mechanical ventilator that stimulates an ill person's breathing by periodically applying negative air pressure to their body to expand and contract the chest cavity.

Other uses:
 De Nederlandse Padvinders (Netherlands Pathfinders), a precursor to Scouting Nederland, the national scouting organisation of the Netherlands

See also